Christian hip hop (originally gospel rap, also known as Christian rap, gospel hip hop or holy hip hop) is a cross-genre of contemporary Christian music and hip hop music. It emerged from urban contemporary music and Christian media in the United States during the 1980s.

Christian hip hop music first emerged on record in 1982 with a track entitled "Jesus Christ (The Gospel Beat)" by Queens, New York artist McSweet. The first full-length, Christian hip hop album, Bible Break, by Oklahoma artist Stephen Wiley, was released in 1985 with the title track becoming a hit on Christian radio in 1986. Other early Christian hip recording artists from the mid-1980s included P.I.D. (Preachas in Disguise), who recorded to funky rock rhythms, as well as JC & the Boys and Michael Peace. During the 1990s and 2000s, rapper KJ-52 rose to prominence in the field.

Christian rock band DC Talk blended hip-hop and rock, and were successful in mainstream Christian music. All three band members have had successful independent careers, Michael Tait and Kevin Max Smith in Christian pop, and TobyMac as a Christian rapper and label owner. Along with Lecrae, NF, KB & Emcee N.I.C.E. who have emerged recently on the mainstream rap scene along with American popular music figure Kanye West. Outside of the United States, there are Christian rap scenes in the UK, Australia, Brazil, Mexico and Canada. Asian, Black, and Latino rappers are becoming a major part of the genre, and this success is expanding the appeal of both Christian hip hop and Christian EDM within general hip hop and broader popular music.

History and notable examples 
The first commercially released and distributed gospel hip hop record was MC Pete Harrison of Queens, New York. Under the recording name McSweet, he released The Gospel Beat: Jesus-Christ (1982), written and arranged by Harrison and produced by Mac Sulliver on Lection Records of PolyGram. The first notable full album released was Stephen Wiley's Bible Break (1985), written by Wiley and produced by Mike Barnes on Brentwood Records. In the same year, David Guzman founded JC & The Boyz. Some of America's premiere Christian rappers, such as: Michael Peace (one of Christian rap's first solo artists), SFC, Dynamic Twins, MC Peace and T-Bone came out of this crew. A more commercially successful group known as P.I.D. (Preachers in Disguise) released five recordings. 

Jon Gibson (or J.G.) is also considered a pioneer of Christian pop rap, with his first rap solo being "Ain't It Pretty" (1985). CCM's first rap hit by a blue-eyed soul singer and/or duo, "The Wall" was later released on Gibson's successful album Change of Heart (1988), and featured MC Hammer (previously as the Holy Ghost Boys). Other tracks included the hit "Love Come Down" and "In Too Deep" from Jesus Loves Ya (1990). Gibson also collaborated with MC Peace on "Enough Is Enough" (1990), "Happy to Know Jesus" (1992) and "You Are the One" (1992). 

Other rap groups emerged in the late 1980s, including dc Talk, E.T.W. (End Time Warriors) and S.F.C. (Soldiers for Christ). ETW was led by producer/artist Mike Hill who went on to pastor one of the largest inner city youth groups in the country out of Tulsa Oklahoma. S.F.C. was led by Chris Cooper who originally rapped as Super C (short for Super Chris / Super Christian) and later became Sup the Chemist and then finally Soup the Chemist. Christian emcee Danny "D-Boy" Rodriguez was another well-known early Gospel rap artist, but was murdered in 1990 in Texas. Prior to his death, he helped launch the career of his sister, Genie Rodriguez-Lopez, known as MC GeGee - one of the first female Christian rap artists, by collaborating on her first album I'm for Real. She would go on to release a second album in 1991, titled And Now the Mission Continues.

The trend of rap artists blending faith and rap continued in the 1990s, with D.O.C. (Disciples of Christ) who emerged from Oklahoma as well as the Gospel Gangstaz from Compton and South Central Los Angeles. In 1991, JC Crew emerged featuring Maximillian (West Coast beat box champion) and T-Bone.

More Christian rap artists include Dynamic Twins, Freedom of Soul, IDOL King, Apocalypse, 12th Tribe, and Holy Alliance. 12th Tribe and Holy Alliance were produced by Scott Blackwell of MYX Records. S.F.C.'s (Sup, QP, DJ Dove) 1992 album Phase III was DJed and produced by DJ Dove, whose credits also include the Gang Affiliated, Gospel Gangstas' 1993 debut album. Around the same time as Phase III, Dynamic Twins (Robbie and Noel) came out with their 1993 album No Room To Breathe. Freedom of Soul (MC Peace, DJ Cartoon) followed with their second album, The Second Coming (Caught in a Land of Time was their first), also their last album as a group.

Gotee Records formed in 1994, co-founded by dc Talk member Toby McKeehan, better known as TobyMac, making it the first record label marketed explicitly for Christian hip hop and R&B that was backed by a major label.  The label was among the first to market the Contemporary Christian music market through distribution at Christian bookstores and playing on Christian radio. 

In 2004, the founding of the label Reach Records by the Americans Lecrae and Ben Washer also had a considerable influence in the development of Christian hip-hop.  In 2015, the label have been setting records with sales and award-winning albums.

Influence and style of artists 

Although generally described to be Christian rappers, artists such as Lecrae, Andy Mineo, KB, Trip Lee, Tedashii, Social Club Misfits, NF, John Givez, Derek Minor and Propaganda describe themselves as hip hop artists who are expressing themselves, yet are openly Christian. Just like in Christian rock and other Christian music genres, some artists welcome being called Christian artists while others do not want to be labeled as "Christian music", as to not limit their music to the Christian music market.

The record label Ministers of the Underground was one of the few labels to showcase underground hip hop with the group, Secta 7. Members included: Apocalypse, Optixs, Blackseed, Lord Metatron, Righteous Knight, Kaoticgal (who later was known as Keturah Ariel), O.N.E., The Final Chapter, A.T.O.M. the Immortal and Stress. Ministers of the Underground had a small-time show on Christian television, but was taken off the networks when Christian television opted for more orthodox style programming. The Ministers of Underground hosted events at a series of venues under the name CRU VENTION, or the convention of Underground Hip Hop for Christ, until around the year 2001.

A few Christian rappers have emerged from Atlanta, including Remnant Militia and D.I.R.T. While many notable studios and artists share influence in holy hip hop, not one style dominates. Christian hip hop features all conventional hip hop styles, such as Midwest (Hostyle Gospel), West Coast (T-Bone), East Coast (BB Jay), Dirty South (Pettidee) and King Wes. Some, such as DC Talk, include a mixture of hip hop, rock and gospel music in their songs.

Christian hip hop is also embraced and performed in the United Kingdom, by Gospel rappers including: Jahaziel, Dwayne Tryumf, Guvna B, Triple O, Sammy G, Simply Andy, MpFree and Just C.

In the UK, Christian hip hop is often merged with a music style known as grime, which gives the music a different sound from American hip hop. Many agree that grime music originated in London's black community and is predominantly described as a secular genre. Although British, grime music has a strong Jamaican influence as many of the artists are of British-Caribbean heritage. The GL Live music event 2010, held in the United Kingdom, included a fusion of Christian rappers (both American and British) celebrate their faith together whilst demonstrating their own unique styles. The event was attended by Trip Lee and Tedashii, who performed several songs during the event including "Jesus Muzik" and "No Worries".

Reaction and acceptance

Industry 
Christian music awards shows such as the GMA Dove Awards and Stellar Awards have added rap and hip hop categories. With the notable exceptions of tobyMac and his label Gotee Records, and Lecrae, no Christian rapper or hip-hop group has garnered the attention of the mainstream Christian music industry. The nominal sales of Christian rap labels have been almost exclusively to white church-going Christians. Christian rap exists almost exclusively underground.

Markets 
There is no identifiable Christian hip hop market, as the majority of Christian hip hop has been underground, or marketed towards the mainstream Christian music scene.

In Australia, a multi-denominational group of Christian hip hop artists, led by Mistery from Brethren, have started a hip hop church, Krosswerdz. The church has been modeled on Crossover Church in Tampa, Florida.

A small Christian hip hop scene has also emerged in the UK.

Festivals 

Rap Fest is an all-day, outdoor, evangelistic outreach concert which takes place every summer. 2011 marked the 18th year for this event held annually in South Bronx area of New York City.

Flavor Fest Urban Leadership Conference is held yearly at Crossover Church in Tampa, Florida, founded by Pastor Tommy Kyllonen, lead pastor of Crossover Church of Tampa.

Fire Fest International Ministries was founded by Charles Onley (a.k.a. King C) in conjunction with Terence A. Townsend, "Apostle T", founder of Save Our City Crusades and Conferences (SoCity) to reach the international community of holy hip hop with a message of encouragement, enrichment, education and unity.  Fire Fest conducts artist retreats, artists/industry conferences and new artists showcases, and is a traveling music festival organized to encourage and enrich holy hip hop artists in their ministries, while giving them insight on navigating the music industry.

"God's House of Hip Hop 20/20 Summer Fest" featuring 75 Christian Hip Hop, Latin Christian Hip Hop & Gospel Hip Hop Music. in Los Angeles, California Founded by Emcee N.I.C.E. and Chantal Grayson of God's House of Hip Hop Radio. Although postponed to July 2021 due to the COVID-19 Corona Virus pandemic, 20/20 Summer Fest gained national attention securing one of Los Angeles's most premium venue's Banc of California Stadium.

Crossover 
Holy hip hop has enjoyed some crossover acceptance as well. One of the early accepted artists were Disciples of Christ (D.O.C.).

One of the most notable mainstream reactions to Gospel rap was to KJ-52 (pronounced "five-two") and his single "Dear Slim", which was written to Eminem in an attempt to reach him with the message of Christ. The song became famous and controversial among Eminem fans when it was featured on the hit show Total Request Live.  began to receive hate mail (including death threats) from Eminem's fans, though  claimed that the song was not a "diss". This also led to the single being disparaged by VH1 as No. 26 on their "Top 40 Worst Moments in Hip Hop", an issue the artist addressed in "Washed Up". In contrast, the GRITS song "Ooh Ahh" received positive exposure on various TV Shows and movies, such as The Fast and the Furious: Tokyo Drift and Big Momma's House 2. It was also featured as the theme song for the second season of MTV's hit show The Buried Life.

Christian symbols and themes have also been invoked by rap artists who do not consider themselves "Christian rappers", and do not claim to represent any particular set of religious beliefs. Examples include MC Hammer's No. 2 single "Pray"; Richie Rich and his first single "Don't Do It"; and many of Tupac's lyrics with his first posthumous record The Don Killuminati: The 7 Day Theory, including the image of Tupac nailed to a cross pinned him as a hip hop martyr. Recent hip hop artists include Jay-Z with Kingdom Come, DMX with "Walk With Me Now and You'll Fly With Me Later", Nas with God's Son and Kanye West with "Jesus Walks" as well as Jesus Is King. However, although these artists may profess to be Christians, they are not generally considered to be part of the Christian hip hop movement. Some Christians believe that hip hop culture in any form conflicts with biblical teachings, while others consider hip hop to be a way of reaching the youth and mainstream culture.

Mainstream and radio 
On September 9, 2014, Lecrae released his album Anomaly, through Reach Records. The album achieved mainstream success as it debuted at number one on the Billboard 200 chart, with first-week sales of over 88,000 copies in the United States. On October 6, 2017, Christian hip hop artist NF released his third studio album Perception, through Capitol CMG alongside NF's newly launched label NF Real Music LLC. Perception debuted at number one on the US Billboard 200 with 55,000 album-equivalent units, including 38,000 pure album sales.

In 2019, Christian hip hop had a historic breakthrough in radio, when Los Angeles based radio station God's House of Hip Hop Radio (powered by Dash Radio and curated by CHH artist Emcee N.I.C.E.), became the first Christian hip hop station in history to win a Stellar Award (one of gospel music's most coveted trophies) at the 34th Annual Stellar Awards. The win signaled a shift not only in gospel but radio as a whole, with more artists outside of Lecrae such as Andy Mineo, Gawvi, Wande, Shepherd, 1K Phew, Swoope, Bizzle, Derek Minor and others receiving commercial notoriety in film, television and gaming. 

The Stellar Awards did something unprecedented at its radio awards main show when it opened up with hip hop and featured performances with DJ Dwight Stone who won "Gospel Announcer of the Year", Miz Tiffany (first CHH female nominated for a Stellar Award), Emcee N.I.C.E. & Jor'Dan Armstrong.

Acceptance and themes 
Various prominent mainstream hip hop artists who profess through some of their music to be Christians (including Kanye West, Nas, DMX and others), have incorporated Christian symbols and messages into their music and videos through images, lyrical content and overarching themes. The 2002 Nas hit song and music video "One Mic", featured obvious references to his Christianity in the song, including the chorus "Yo all I need is... One God to show me how to do things his Son did..." Kanye West's 2004 hit song and music video "Jesus Walks", has received a notable amount of attention for its Christian content. DMX incorporated prayers in many of his albums, and his 2006 song and music video "Lord Give Me a Sign", was highlighted by not only strong Christian lyrical content but actual scriptural quotes ("no weapon formed against me shall prosper and every tongue that rises up against me in judgment, Thou shall condemn") from the Holy Bible. Prominent Christian rapper Lecrae, whose 2014 album "Anomaly" reached number 1 on the Billboard 200 and received numerous other accolades, expresses an explicitly Christian message in the majority of his music. However, while generally categorized as a gospel or Christian rapper, he distances himself from the genre of gospel rap saying, "Christian is my faith not my genre".

The use of religious themes in music that is otherwise regarded as illicit has sparked controversy over the validity of the religious messages expressed through the music. Some Christian listeners hold that "rap music, because of what it inherently communicates, is incompatible with the Christian Gospel", and attack the use of Christian themes and symbols in mainstream music as being disingenuous. On the other hand, "since the mid-1990s Michael Eric Dyson and others have pointed to some cultural sensibilities shared by Christian churches and hip hop music; namely male privilege, middle-class biases, sexism, and homophobia." Some analysts believe that the suffering expressed through rap music manifests itself in a certain spirituality that can be compatible with mainstream religious messages, although it approaches religious ideas in a much less direct way than most forms of religious expression. "Just as the MC slides into notes and dances around beats, "spirit" is not attacked straight on; it is courageously approached from below, from the margins, from youth, from uncertainty, through the structures of capitalism and mainstream media." Some think that the use of mainstream religious symbols in predominantly African-American music has increased the extent to which that music has disseminated through predominantly white American culture.

The 2007 Holy Hip Hop Music Awards received a written endorsement letter from the mayor of Atlanta, acknowledging the event's support by the City of Atlanta, and recognizing its 7th year. However, EX Ministries and other churches contested the incorporation of secular hip hop culture into the Christian rap genre, holding that "Holy Hip-Hop" is still associated with the mainstream hip hop culture that they view as incompatible with Christianity's teachings. Whereas many Christians hold that holy hip hop can be used to evangelize, others disagree, arguing that the use of this style distorts the gospel message.

From December 2013 well into 2014, Scott Aniol and Christian hip hop artist Shai Linne had a lengthy exchange about Christian rap (rap being the core element of hip hop), with Dr. Aniol arguing that the style is sinful and inadequate for Christian messages, with Shai Linne responding that the musical messaging of hip hop is relative, being interpreted differently by people from different backgrounds.

Forms and subgenres

Catholic hip hop 

In the early 2000s, rap artists of the Roman Catholic faith began emerging. Today, a number of active Catholic rappers and DJs are involved in what is known as the "Catholic hip hop scene". Fr. Stan Fortuna is the most notable in the scene.

Lutheran hip hop 
Lutheran hip hop artists include Andy Pokel, who in 2017 launched the Here I Stand album based on the events of Reformation Day, as well as Flame, whose album Christ for You, focuses on Lutheran doctrines such as the sacramental union, the Lutheran teaching on the real presence of Christ in the Eucharist. Flame named his album Christ for You as he wants his fans "to experience the joy and freedom that I’ve found in the sacraments." His track “Scattered Tulips” is a critique of Reformed Christianity's five points (TULIP). The release of Christ for You led the Lutheran Church–Missouri Synod to declare that "Lutheran hip hop is a thing now!" The Evangelical Lutheran Church of Finland has commissioned two rap videos—Kaunis Jeesus and Hoosianna.

Gospel rap in Brazil 
In Brazil, gospel rap comes out of Pentecostal and Charismatic Evangelical Protestant movements, and emphasizes the message of the Gospel and salvation through faith over black politics and identity. Gospel rappers view their music as divinely ordained, and believe their lyrics are a manifestation of the Holy Spirit speaking through them. The Brazilian gospel rap movement sees itself as divinely favored over the fallen state of rap in the US and other parts of the world, and sees its origins in the Bronx which they see as similar to their own tough neighborhoods. This reflects the gospel rap movement's emphasis on neighborhood and seeking God and opportunities for their neighborhoods.

See also
 List of Christian performers of hip hop and rap
 Rapzilla
 God's House of Hip Hop Radio

References

External links 

 
 Rapzilla, a Christian Hip-Hop Magazine

 
Hip hop
Hip hop genres
African-American culture